Coming-of-age stories focus on the growth of a protagonist from childhood to adulthood, or "coming of age", and span a variety of media, including literature, theatre, film, and video games.

In literature

 The Telemachy in Homer's Odyssey (8th century BC)
 Hayy ibn Yaqdhan, by Ibn Tufail (12th century)
 The History of Tom Jones, a Foundling, by Henry Fielding (1749)
 The Life and Opinions of Tristram Shandy, Gentleman, by Laurence Sterne (1759)
 Candide, by Voltaire (1759)
 Northanger Abbey, by Jane Austen (1817)
 Oliver Twist, by Charles Dickens (1837–1839)
 Great Expectations, by Charles Dickens (1860–1861)
 Little Women, by Louisa May Alcott (1868–1869)
 Little Men, by Louisa May Alcott (1871)
 The Adventures of Tom Sawyer, by Mark Twain (1876)
 The Adventures of Huckleberry Finn, by Mark Twain (1884–1885)
 The Jungle Book by Rudyard Kipling (1894)
 The Red Badge of Courage, by Stephen Crane (1894–1895)
 The Blue Lagoon, by Henry De Vere Stacpoole (1908)
 Anne of Green Gables, by Lucy Maud Montgomery (1908)
 A Portrait of the Artist as a Young Man by James Joyce (1916)
 All Quiet on the Western Front, by Erich Maria Remarque (1929)
 The Heart Is a Lonely Hunter, by Carson McCullers (1940)
 A Tree Grows in Brooklyn, by Betty Smith (1943)
 Johnny Tremain, by Esther Forbes (1943)
 The Catcher in the Rye, by J.D. Salinger (1951)
 East of Eden, by John Steinbeck (1952)
 Old Yeller, by Fred Gipson (1956)
 The Baron in the Trees, by Italo Calvino (1957)
 Flowers for Algernon, short story and novel by Daniel Keyes (short story 1959, novel 1966)
 To Kill a Mockingbird, novel by Harper Lee (1960)
 Where the Red Fern Grows, by Wilson Rawls (1961)
 A Clockwork Orange, a novel by Anthony Burgess (1962)
 The Learning Tree, novel by Gordon Parks (1963)
 The Graduate, novel by Charles Webb (1963)
 The Bell Jar, by Sylvia Plath (1964)
 The Last Picture Show, by Larry McMurtry (1966)
 The Outsiders, by S.E. Hinton (1967)
 Last Summer, by Evan Hunter (1968)
 Sounder, by William H. Armstrong (1969)
 A Day No Pigs Would Die, by Robert Newton Peck (1972)
 A Hero Ain't Nothin' But a Sandwich, by Alice Childress (1973)
 Ordinary People, by Judith Guest (1976)
 A River Runs Through It, by Norman Maclean (1976)
 Vision Quest, by Terry Davis (1979)
 The Body, short story by Stephen King (1982) 
 The Color Purple, by Alice Walker (1982)
 The Sheep-Pig, by Dick King-Smith (1983)
 Ender's Game, by Orson Scott Card (1985)
 It, by Stephen King (1986)
 This Boy's Life, memoirs by Tobias Wolff (1989)
 What's Eating Gilbert Grape, by Peter Hedges (1991)
 The Virgin Suicides, by Jeffrey Eugenides (1993)
 Ghost World, graphic novel by Daniel Clowes (1993–1997)
 The Dangerous Lives of Altar Boys, novel by Chris Fuhrman (1994)
 The Zigzag Kid, by David Grossman (1994)
 Into the Widening World, a collection of 26 short fictional coming-of-age stories by 26 notable authors (published 1995)
 Harry Potter, by J.K. Rowling (1997–2007)
 The Perks of Being a Wallflower, by Stephen Chbosky (1999)
Alex Rider, by Anthony Horowitz (2000–till date)
 The Sisterhood of the Traveling Pants, by Ann Brashares (2001)
 Life of Pi, by Yann Martel (2001)
 Invincible, by Robert Kirkman (2003–2018)
 The Power of Five, by Anthony Horowitz (2005–2012)
 Winter's Bone, by Daniel Woodrell (2006)
 Call Me by Your Name, by André Aciman (2007)
 Someday This Pain Will Be Useful to You, by Peter Cameron (2007)
 The Enola Holmes Mysteries: The Case of the Missing Marquess, by Nancy Springer (2007)
 The Name of the Wind and the rest of The Kingkiller Chronicles by Patrick Rothfuss (2007–present)
 Skulduggery Pleasant and Valkyrie Cain by Derek Landy (2007–2014; 2017–present)
 Goodnight Punpun, by Inio Asano (2007)
 Paper Towns, by John Green (2008)
 Homestuck, by Andrew Hussie (2009)
 The Miseducation of Cameron Post, by Emily M. Danforth (2012)
 Me and Earl and the Dying Girl, by Jesse Andrews (2012)
 Simon vs. the Homo Sapiens Agenda, by Becky Albertalli (2015)
 Boy Erased: A Memoir, by Garrard Conley (2016)
 Bones & All, novel by Camille DeAngelis (2015)
 The Hate U Give, by Angie Thomas (2017)
 Dear Evan Hansen: The Novel, by Val Emmich with Steven Levenson, Benj Pasek and Justin Paul (2018)
 The Prom: The Novel, by Saundra Mitchell with Matthew Sklar, Chad Beguelin and Bob Martin (2019)

In theatre

Musical theatre
 West Side Story (1957–present)
 Oliver! (1960–present)
 Miss Saigon (1989–present)
 Once on This Island (1990–present)
 Billy Elliot the Musical (2005–2016)
 Spring Awakening (2006–2015)
 Hadestown (2006–present)
 Dear Evan Hansen (2015–present)
 Everybody's Talking About Jamie (2017–present)
 Mean Girls (2017–present)
 The Prom (2017–present)
 & Juliet (2019–present)

Play
 4000 Miles (2011–2013, 2022)
 Choir Boy (2012–2019)

In film and television

In film, coming-of-age is a genre of teen films. Films in this subgenre include:
 Little Women (1933)
 Anne of Green Gables (1934)
 Captains Courageous (1937)
 The Adventures of Tom Sawyer (1938)
 The Adventures of Huckleberry Finn (1939)
 The Wizard of Oz (1939)
 Babes in Arms (1939)
 Pinocchio (1940)
 Little Men (1940)
 Bambi (1942)
 The Human Comedy (1943)
 Meet Me In St. Louis (1944)
 A Tree Grows in Brooklyn (1945)
 Great Expectations (1946)
 Oliver Twist (1948)
 The Blue Lagoon (1949)
 Cattle Drive (1951)
 The Red Badge of Courage (1951)
 East of Eden (1955)
 Rebel Without a Cause (1955)
 The Apu Trilogy (1955–1959)
 Old Yeller (1957)
 Johnny Tremain (1957)
 The House of the Angel (1957)
 The 400 Blows (1959)
 the 1961 and 2021 film versions of West Side Story
 To Kill a Mockingbird (1962)
 David and Lisa (1962)
 The Heart Is a Lonely Hunter (1968)
 Oliver! (1968)
 Romeo and Juliet (1968)
 Kes (1969)
 Last Summer (1969)
 The Learning Tree (1969)
 The Last Picture Show (1971)
 Summer of '42 (1971)
 Walkabout (1971)
 Sounder (1972)
 American Graffiti (1973)
 Badlands (1973)
 Tom Sawyer (1973)
 Huckleberry Finn (1974)
 Where the Red Fern Grows (1974)
 Cooley High (1975)
 Cornbread, Earl and Me (1975)
 the original Star Wars Trilogy (1977–1983)
 Saturday Night Fever (1977)
 A Hero Ain't Nothin' But a Sandwich (1978)
 Big Wednesday (1978)
 Bloodbrothers (1978)
 Breaking Away (1979)
 Over the Edge (1979)
 Fame (1980)
 Foxes (1980)
 Ordinary People (1980)
 The Blue Lagoon (1980)
 Endless Love (1981)
 Gregory's Girl (1981)
 The Fox and the Hound (1981)
 The Last American Virgin (1982)
 Flashdance (1983)
 The Outsiders (1983)
 Risky Business (1983)
 Rumble Fish (1983)
 The Bay Boy (1984)
 Sixteen Candles (1984)
 The Karate Kid (1984)
 The Color Purple (1985)
 the Back to the Future Trilogy (1985–1990)
 The Breakfast Club (1985)
 Fandango (1985)
 Heaven Help Us (1985) aka Catholic Boys
 Mischief (1985)
 Vision Quest (1985)
 Pretty in Pink (1986)
 Stand by Me (1986)
 Some Kind of Wonderful (1987)
 Empire of the Sun (1987)
 Running on Empty (1988)
 Stand and Deliver (1988)
 Stealing Home (1988)
 Big (1988)
 Heathers (1988)
 Dead Poets Society (1989)
 Say Anything... (1989)
 The Little Mermaid (1989)
 A Brighter Summer Day (1989)
 Mermaids (1990)
 My Own Private Idaho (1991)
 Dogfight (1991)
 Boyz n the Hood (1991)
 The Man in the Moon (1991)
 Flirting (1991)
 A River Runs Through It (1992)
 A Bronx Tale (1993)
 Menace II Society (1993)
 Dazed and Confused (1993)
 This Boy's Life (1993)
 What's Eating Gilbert Grape (1993)
 The Thief and the Cobbler (1993)
 The Adventures of Huck Finn (1993)
 There Goes My Baby (1994)
 Little Women (1994)
 The Lion King (1994)
 Babe (1995)
 The Basketball Diaries (1995)
 Kids (1995)
 Clueless (1995)
 Whisper of the Heart (1995)
 Tom and Huck (1995)
 Romeo + Juliet (1996)
 Titanic (1997)
 Telling Lies in America (1997)
 All I Wanna Do (1998)
 10 Things I Hate About You (1999)
 The Virgin Suicides (1999)
 The Wood (1999)
 The Iron Giant (1999)
 American Beauty (1999)
 Girl, Interrupted (1999)
 Almost Famous (2000)
 Billy Elliot (2000)
 Girlfight (2000)
 Bring It On (2000)
 How the Grinch Stole Christmas (2000)
 Y tu mamá también (2001)
 Spirited Away (2001)
 The Princess Diaries (2001)
 Dil Chahta Hai (2001)
 the Harry Potter Franchise (2001–2011)
 The Dangerous Lives of Altar Boys (2002)
 Bend It Like Beckham (2002)
 Better Luck Tomorrow (2002)
 Spirit: Stallion of the Cimarron (2002)
 Thirteen (2003)
 The Motorcycle Diaries (2003)
 House of D (2004) 
 13 Going on 30 (2004)
 Lakshya (2004)
 Mean Girls (2004)
 Temporada de patos (2004)
 The Sisterhood of the Traveling Pants (2005)
 ATL (2006)
 Superbad (2007)
 Happy Days (2007)
 Hounddog (2007)
 Persepolis (2007)
 Juno (2007)
 The Poker House (2008)
 35 Shots of Rum (2008)
 Let the Right One In (2008)
 The Reader (2008)
 Gamyam (2008)
 Slumdog Millionaire (2008)
 Kotha Bangaru Lokam (2008)
 Fish Tank (2009)
 Bandslam (2009)
 Wake Up Sid (2009)
 How To Train Your Dragon (2010–2019)
 Winter's Bone (2010)
 Submarine (2010)
 Let Me In (2010)
 Pariah (2011)
 Hick (2011)
 Turn Me On, Dammit! (2011)
 Life of Pi (2012)
 Moonrise Kingdom (2012)
 The Perks of Being a Wallflower (2012)
 The Zigzag Kid (2012)
 The Spectacular Now (2013)
 The Kings of Summer (2013)
 The Way Way Back (2013)
 Wetlands (2013)
 Fukrey (2013)
 Boyhood (2014), which was filmed with the same cast over a period of twelve years
 Girlhood (2014)
 The Fault in Our Stars (2014)
 The Falling (2014)
 Mustang (2015)
 Me and Earl and the Dying Girl (2015)
 The Diary of a Teenage Girl (2015)
 Dope (2015)
 Mistress America (2015)
 Paper Towns (2015)
 Coming Through the Rye (2015)
 Kerintha (2015)
 Sleeping Giant (2015)
 Yevade Subramanyam (2015)
 Inside Out (2015)
 The Peanuts Movie (2015)
 Moana (2016)
 Moonlight (2016)
 The Edge of Seventeen (2016)
 American Honey (2016)
 20th Century Women (2016)
 2 Cool 2 Be 4gotten (2016) 
 Call Me by Your Name (2017)
 Hot Summer Nights (2017)
 Lady Bird (2017)
 It (2017)
 November Criminals (2017)
 Vunnadhi Okate Zindagi (2017)
 Coco  (2017) 
 Eighth Grade (2018)
 Mid90s (2018)
 The Hate U Give (2018)
 Leave No Trace (2018)
 Boy Erased (2018)
 The Miseducation of Cameron Post (2018)
 Love, Simon (2018)
 To All the Boys I've Loved Before (2018)
 Bumblebee (2018) 
 The Grinch (2018)
 The King (2019)
 The Lion King (2019)
 Booksmart (2019)
 Little Women (2019)
 Yes, God, Yes (2019)
 Cuties (2020)
 Enola Holmes (2020)
 Onward (2020)
 Digimon Adventure: Last Evolution Kizuna (2020)
 Nahuel and the Magic Book (2020)
 The Half of It (2020)
 The Prom (2020)
 Cherry (2021)
 Chhello Show (2021)
 Luca  (2021)
 Dear Evan Hansen (2021)
 Everybody's Talking About Jamie (2021)
 There's Someone Inside Your House (2021)
 Licorice Pizza (2021)
 Encanto (2021)
 CODA (2021)
 The Hand of God (2021)
 The Black Phone (2021)
 Live Is Life (2021)
 Turning Red (2022)
 Bones and All (2022)
 Merrily We Roll Along (TBA)

Films featuring protagonists in particular age groups, such as pre-teens, are:
 Melody (1971)
 Pretty Baby (1978)
 E.T. the Extra-Terrestrial (1982)
 My Girl (1991)
 The Sandlot (1993)
 Léon: The Professional (1994)
 Crooklyn (1994)
 Now and Then (1995)
 The White Balloon (1995)
  Matilda (1996)
 Ponette (1996)
 Pan's Labyrinth (2006)
 Beasts of the Southern Wild (2012)
 Jojo Rabbit (2019)
 The Fabelmans (2022)

or post-high school and college students, in films such as:
 Love Story (1970)
 Young People (1972)
 Carrie (1976)
 Animal House (1978)
 Grease (1978)
 Porky's (1981)
 Fast Times at Ridgemont High (1982)
 Footloose (1984)
 With Honors (1994)
 Kicking and Screaming (1995)
 Good Will Hunting (1997)
 Can't Hardly Wait (1998)
 American Pie (1999)
 Ghost World (2001)
 the Spider-Man film franchise (2002–present)
 An Education (2009)
 3 Idiots (2009)
 Whiplash (2014)
 Everybody Wants Some!! (2016) 
 Aanandam (2016)
 Meesaya Murukku (2017)
 Chhichhore (2018)
 The Souvenir (2019)
 Pink Skies Ahead (2020)
 Don (2022)

or people aged around 20 years old who do not go to college, such as:

 Brooklyn (2015)
 Sweet 20 (2017)

or in the case of unique coming-of-age stories centered on post-college aged individuals, such as:
 All Quiet on the Western Front (1930)
 The Seven Year Itch (1955)
 The Graduate (1967)
 Charly (1968)
 Taxi Driver (1976)
 An Officer and a Gentleman (1982)
 St. Elmo's Fire (1985)
 What's Eating Gilbert Grape (1993)
 Never Been Kissed (1999)
 Old School (2003)
 The 40-Year-Old Virgin (2005)
 All Quiet on the Western Front (2022)

Coming-of-age television series include:
 Happy Days (1974–1984)
the Degrassi franchise (1979–2017)
 One Summer (1983)
 Annika (1984)
 The Wonder Years (1988–1993)
 Boy Meets World (1993–2000)
 My So-Called Life (1994–1995)
 Malhação (1995–present)
 That 70's Show (1998–2006)
 Freaks and Geeks (1999–2000)
 Buffy the Vampire Slayer (1997–2003)
 Dawson's Creek (1998–2003)
 Skins (2007–2013) 
 Gossip Girl (2007–2012)
 Glee (2009–2015)
 Anohana: The Flower We Saw That Day (2011)
 Teen Wolf (2011–2017)
 Adventure Time (2010–2018)
 Gravity Falls  (2012–2016)
 Steven Universe (2013–2020)
 Over the Garden Wall (2014)
 Girl Meets World (2014–2017)
 Younger (2015–2021)
 Skam (2015–2017)
 We Bare Bears (2015–2019)
 Stranger Things (2016–present) 
 A Series of Unfortunate Events (2017-2019)
 Anne with an E (2017–2019)
 Atypical (2017–2021)
 13 Reasons Why (2017–2020)
 One Day at a Time (2017–2020)
 On My Block (2018–2021)
 SKAM Austin (2018–2019)
 Hilda (2018–present)
 Everything Sucks! (2018)
 The End of the F***ing World (2017–2019)
 Sex Education (2019–present)
 PEN15 (2019–2021)
 Mao Mao: Heroes of Pure Heart (2019–present)
 Amphibia (2019–2022)
 Euphoria (2019–present)
 Sintonia (2019–present)
 Ladhood (2019–present)
 I Am Not Okay with This (2020)
 Love, Victor (2020–2022)
 The Queen's Gambit (2020)
 We Are Who We Are (2020)
 Grand Army (2020–present)
 Young Royals (2021–present)
 Twenty-Five Twenty-One (2022)
 Heartstopper (2022-present)
 Ms. Marvel (2022)
 Wednesday (2022-present) 
 Girlboss (2017)

In video games
While not represented as often as in other mediums, coming-of-age stories can also be found in video games such as Life Is Strange''.

References

Film genres
Literary genres
Works about adolescence